Sheung-King is the pen name of Aaron Tang, a Canadian writer whose debut novel You Are Eating an Orange. You Are Naked. was a shortlisted nominee for the 2021 Amazon.ca First Novel Award and the 2021 Governor General's Award for English-language fiction.

Born in Vancouver, British Columbia, Tang lived in both Canada and Hong Kong before moving to Toronto, Ontario. You Are Eating an Orange. You Are Naked was published in 2020 by Book*hug.

References

External links

21st-century Canadian novelists
21st-century Canadian male writers
Canadian male novelists
Canadian writers of Asian descent
Canadian people of Hong Kong descent
Writers from Vancouver
Living people
Year of birth missing (living people)